Baratikha is a rural locality (a village) in Tarasovskoye Rural Settlement of Plesetsky District, Arkhangelsk Oblast, Russia. The population was 29 as of 2010.

Geography 
Baratikha is located on the Shorda River, 100 km east of Plesetsk (the district's administrative centre) by road. Yura-Gora is the nearest rural locality.

References 

Rural localities in Plesetsky District